A shared-use path, mixed-use path or multi-use pathway is a path which is "designed to accommodate the movement of pedestrians and cyclists". Examples of shared-use paths include sidewalks designated as shared-use, bridleways and rail trails. A shared-use path typically has a surface that is asphalt, concrete or firmly packed crushed aggregate. Shared-use paths differ from cycle tracks and cycle paths in that shared-use paths are designed to include pedestrians even if the primary anticipated users are cyclists. 

The path may also permit other users such as inline skating. Contrastingly, motorcycles and mopeds are normally prohibited. Shared-use paths sometimes provide different lanes for users who travel at different speeds to prevent conflicts between user groups on high-use trails. Shared-use paths are criticised for creating conflict between different users. The UK's Department for Transport deprecates this kind of route in denser urban environments.

Types

Bridleways 
In the UK, cyclists are legally permitted to cycle on bridleways (paths open to horse riders), but not on public footpaths. Therefore, bridleways are, in effect, a form of shared-use path.

Segregated paths 

On segregated or divided paths, the path is split into a section for pedestrians and a section for cyclists. This may be achieved with a painted line or different surface. It may also be delineated with tactile paving for blind and visually impaired pedestrians.

Research by the UK Department for Transport found that cyclists and pedestrians prefer wider non-segregated paths to more narrow segregated paths (e.g. a 3 m wide shared path, compared with a 3 m path split into 1.5 m sections).

Benefits 
The principal benefit of a shared-use path is saving space. This may be important in environmentally-sensitive areas or on narrow streets, where a full cycle track may not be feasible.

Issues 
Shared use paths are criticised for creating conflict between pedestrians and cyclists and creating complaints from pedestrians and speed. Therefore, the paths do not properly take into account the different needs of different road users. For example a study by the Institute for Chartered Engineers found that users of shared use paths were confused about the nature of the path and who has priority on them.

Pedestrians are sometimes unsure how to behave on shared-use paths. The question arises whether the path is to be treated as a road (therefore pedestrians should face oncoming traffic) or a path (and therefore pedestrians may walk wherever they choose).

Shared-use paths alongside the highway often look like sidewalks to motorists. Therefore, at side roads, in jurisdictions where pedestrians do not have priority at side roads, the priority situation at side roads on shared-use paths can be confusing and often cyclists are required to give way to turning motorists.

By country

United Kingdom 

Before the January 2022 revision, the Highway Code gave no advice to pedestrians on how to share space with cyclists; there was is also little guidance given to cyclists. (The 2023 edition covers both aspects.The UK Department for Transport advises local authorities that cyclists and pedestrians should not be expected to share space on or alongside city streets.

The Milton Keynes redway system is an example of a city-wide network of shared-use paths.

United States 
In the US, the 1999 AASHTO Guide for the Development of Bicycle Facilities defines a shared-use path as being physically separated from motor vehicular traffic with an open space or barrier.

See also 
 
 Cycling infrastructure
 List of rail trails
 Rail trail
 Shared-use trail section in Trail page

References 

Transport infrastructure
Cycling infrastructure